Dociostaurus jagoi is a species of grasshoppers: typical of the tribe Dociostaurini and placed in the subgenus Kazakia. It was named after the English orthopterist Nicholas Jago and is found in the western Palearctic region.

Subspecies
These subspecies belong to the species Dociostaurus jagoi:
 D. jagoi jagoi Soltani, 1978 (Jago's Grasshopper)
 D. jagoi occidentalis Soltani, 1978

References

External links

 

Gomphocerinae
Orthoptera of Europe